The Bombardment of Valparaíso on 31 March 1866 took place during the Chincha Islands War, when a Spanish fleet shelled, burned and destroyed the undefended port of Valparaíso.

Background
After the humiliating defeat at the Battle of Papudo and the indecisive Battle of Abtao, Rear Admiral Casto Méndez Núñez was ordered to take punitive action against South American ports. When the Chilean government ordered that vessels supplying or communicating with the Spanish fleet should not be allowed to enter Chilean ports, Méndez Núñez's first target became the most important and undefended Chilean city of Valparaíso.

Attempts at mediation
Efforts to mediate were initially steered by European diplomats whose countrymen were most affected by the initial blockade of Chilean ports and by the threat of bombardment. High-level contacts took place intensively in late 1865 and early 1866 between London, Paris and Madrid. A formula to resolve the conflict appeared, at one stage, to have been secured. In the final two weeks, the United States was especially active. The American minister to Chile, General Hugh Judson Kilpatrick and the US Naval Commander John Rodgers who was at port commanding a US naval squadron composed of the ironclad monitor  and the warships ,  and  attempted a last-minute settlement with the Spanish Admiral. The British commander, despite coming under great pressure from British merchants in the city, after consulting with the chief British diplomat in Chile William Taylour Thomson, decided to enforce strict neutrality, refusing to let his ships cooperate. Thomson himself was more concerned with the well-being of Spanish civilians in Chile than with the concerns of the British merchants in Chile and did not want the Royal Navy to do anything to provoke the Spanish.
 

Ultimately, all the attempts at mediation failed, as the chief condition of Admiral Méndez Núñez was the proper salute to the Spanish flag, the return by the Chileans of the captured Schooner Covadonga and the immediate payment of a crippling indemnity. The talks broke over the matter of the flag salute. When General Kilpatrick threatened to defend the port with the US squadron and attack the Spanish fleet, Admiral Méndez Núñez famously responded with, "I will be forced to sink [the US ships], because even if I have one ship left I will proceed with the bombardment. Spain, the Queen and I prefer honor without ships than ships without honor." Consequently the Spanish Admiral, notwithstanding the protest of the diplomatic corps, gave notice on March 27 to all neutrals to evacuate the city.

Bombardment
At 7 am on March 31, the Spanish fleet took positions in front of their targets. It consisted of the Numancia, Resolución, Villa de Madrid, Blanca, Vencedora and the Paquete del Maule. The frigate Berenguela remained behind to guard against the possible escape of the merchant fleet. At 8.10 AM, the Numancia discharged two shots as final notice and to give opportunity for the people still in town to take cover. The bombardment itself started at 9 am and lasted for three hours without fire being returned, as Valparaíso was totally defenseless.

The Spanish bombarded the town unhindered. The loss in public and private property was estimated at $1,000,000, and in merchandise at $9,000,000, huge sums at the time. One recent account suggests that in today's money the losses amounted to the equivalent of around $224,000,000 

The action created an international scandal. While the Spanish were heavily criticized for attacking an unarmed city, so too was the British government for not employing its own naval force to protect the lives and property of its own nationals. Most of the losses were actually endured by British merchants, and a large argument developed in the British Parliament when news arrived in May 1866.

Painting

James McNeill Whistler, who was on board the American ships, painted his famous "Nocturne in Blue and Gold: Valparaíso Bay" the night before the bombardment. It shows the Chilean merchant fleet at their moorings waiting to be destroyed.

Notes

Sources

External links

History of South America
Naval battles involving Spain
Battles involving Chile
Battles of the Chincha Islands War
Conflicts in 1866
1866 in Chile
History of Valparaíso Region
March 1866 events